Deepa is a Hindu/Sanskrit Indian given name.

Deepa may also refer to:

 Deepa (album), a 1992 album by American band Troop, and its title track
 Deepa, Meghalaya, India, site of a proposed station on the Dudhnoi - Mendipathar Rail Line
 Diya (lamp), an Indian clay lamp

See also
 DIPA (disambiguation)